Bixby Knolls is a neighborhood in Long Beach, California, named after the Bixby family.

Location
Bixby Knolls is an area of Long Beach adjoining North Long Beach to the north, California Heights on the southeast, Wrigley on the southwest.  Its approximate boundaries are the 405 Freeway to the south (or Wardlow Avenue), Del Amo Blvd to the north (or the Southern Pacific railroad tracks), the Los Angeles River and the Lakewood city boundary to the west of Atlantic Avenue, south of Bixby Road.  Atlantic Avenue and Long Beach Boulevard are the main north-south arteries through the neighborhood.  The neighborhood includes the Los Cerritos - Virginia Country Club and the original Los Cerritos Ranch House historic site.

Description
The majority of the homes in the area were custom-built between 1920 and 1940, providing a variety of home architecture.  Small shops and restaurants dot a strip of Atlantic Avenue south of San Antonio and north of the 405 Freeway, as well as on the streets surrounding this main thoroughfare.  The neighborhood is also served by several nearby grocery stores and shopping centers.

Bixby Knolls has an active local community.  The Helen Borgers Theater, home to the Long Beach Shakespeare Company, and the Historical Society of Long Beach, are housed on Atlantic Avenue, just north of Carson Street.  On the west side of the neighborhood, adjacent to the Los Angeles River, is the large Virginia Country Club, which is also the location of the Rancho Los Cerritos historic site.

Schools
The Long Beach Unified School District serves Bixby Knolls.

Bixby Knolls area public schools include Longfellow Elementary School, Los Cerritos Elementary School, Burroughs Elementary School. and Hughes Middle School.  Longfellow has been recognized as a California Distinguished School. Several private schools are also in the area including St. Barnabas School.

For high school, the home school is Long Beach Polytechnic High School, but students can apply to any eligible program in the Long Beach Unified School District.

Parks
The Bixby Knolls Park is in the area. Other parks include Los Cerritos Park in the Los Cerritos neighborhood and Somerset Park in the Bixby Terrace neighborhood.

Historical places and notable architecture
Long Beach's Virginia Country Club golf course and Los Cerritos Ranch House, a city owned historical site, are located in the adjacent Los Cerritos and Virginia Country Club neighborhoods, which are typically considered a part of Bixby Knolls.

Southern California chain Robert's department store had its flagship store in Bixby Knolls at 4450 Atlantic Avenue. It opened in December 1967 and was 52,000 sq. ft. in size. closed in 1994, and sat empty for 15 years. It was razed only in 2009, to make way for a new Marshall's. The loss of the store was long symbolic of the decline of Bixby Knolls as a retail center, and in a broader sense. The Petroleum Club operated between 1955 and 2019.

Notable architecture includes:

See also
Neighborhoods of Long Beach, California

References

External links
We Love Bixby Knolls
Bixby Knolls Business Improvement Association

Neighborhoods in Long Beach, California